Kadri Mälk (27 January 1958 – 1 January 2023) was an Estonian artist and jewellery designer.

Life and career
Mälk was born in Tallinn and began her studies at the Tartu Art School in 1977 and graduated from the Estonian Academy of Arts in 1986, studying under professor Leili Kuldkepp. Between 1986 and 1993, Mälk worked as a freelance artist. In 1993, she enrolled at the Lahti Design Institute in Finland, studying gemmology under the direction of Esko Timonen and completed her studies at Bernd Munsteiner's lapidary studio in Germany. Mälk was assigned to the Estonian Academy of Arts from 1989 and was also a professor in the jewellery department at the school from 1996. 

Mälk had both solo and group exhibitions throughout the world. Her jewellery designs have been displayed in various museums and exhibitions in:  Estonia, Latvia, Lithuania, Germany, Belgium, Denmark, Finland, the United States, South Korea, Russia, Slovakia, France, Japan, the United Kingdom, Sweden, Spain and Norway.

Mälk was married three times. Her final husband was writer and translator Mati Sirkel.

Mälk died on 1 January 2023, at the age of 64.

Awards
2017 Order of the White Star, V Class
1998 Estonian State Cultural Award
1997 Estonian Culture Capital Art Prize of the Year 
1997 Award of Excellence, Shippo Conference, Tokyo, Japan 
1995 Estfem, Estonian Woman prize 
1994 The Kristjan Raud Annual Art Prize 
1992 PRIX ARTICA Honourable Mention, Finland 
1988 Grand Prix at the IV Applied Art Triennial, Estonia 
1987 Young Artisan Prize of the Year, Estonia

References

External links

FATA MORGANA - the exhibition of jewels by Kadri Mälk in Lisbon (archived version)
Klimt 02: Interview with Kadri Mälk 

1958 births
2023 deaths
20th-century Estonian women artists
21st-century Estonian women artists
Artists from Tallinn
Estonian jewellery designers
Estonian Academy of Arts alumni
Academic staff of the Estonian Academy of Arts
Recipients of the Order of the White Star, 5th Class
20th-century Estonian artists
21st-century Estonian artists